Myōhōji Station is the name of two train stations in Japan:

 Myōhōji Station (Hyōgo)
 Myōhōji Station (Niigata)